KKML may refer to:

 KKML (FM), a radio station (90.9 FM) licensed to serve Minden, Louisiana, United States
 KCSF, a radio station (1300 AM) licensed to serve Colorado Springs, Colorado, United States